Trenarth Bridge (meaning bridge of Nerth's farm) is at the head of the centre head of Port Navas Creek and is between Mawnan Smith and Porth Navas.

References

Bridges in Cornwall